Jada Alberts is an Aboriginal Australian actor, playwright, screenwriter, director, artist and poet.

Early life and education
Alberts is from the Top End of Australia, of Larrakia, Yanuwa, Bardi and Wardaman descent. Their mother is Franchesca Cubillo.

They attended Mary MacKillop College in the Adelaide suburb of Kensington from 1996 to 2001, and graduated from Adelaide Centre for the Arts in 2006.

Career
Alberts works in many mediums: they are an actor, musician, painter, poet, and playwright. They have also written for the screen.

Stage
Alberts has regularly acted on stage since at least 2005, when they performed in two productions as a third-year student at the Adelaide Centre for the Arts. One of these was King Lear. In 2013–2014, Alberts took the role of Goneril in a touring production of The Shadow King, which "rework[ed] Shakespeare’s timeless tragedy King Lear as a sprawling, blood-soaked tale of two Indigenous families in Australia's north".

Alberts performed in Frost/Nixon and The Birthday Party for Melbourne Theatre Company; Second to None, for Vitalstatistix and Kurruru Performing Arts; Cat (Windmill Theatre); Yibiyung (Company B / Malthouse Theatre); Wulamanayuwi and the Seven Pamanui (Darwin Festival); The Green Sheep (Cate Fowler); and several tours, both within Australia and overseas, of Saltbush (Insight Arts). In 2013 they were in This Heaven (Company B); and Hipbone Sticking Out (YijilaYala/Big hART). 

Alberts was assistant director of Windmill Baby for Company B in 2011. They have been involved in various projects for Melbourne Workers Theatre, Arena Theatre Company, RealTV and State Theatre Company South Australia (STCSA). 

They have also written for the stage, including the play Brothers Wreck, first performed in 2014 by Company B at the Belvoir Theatre in Sydney, directed by Leah Purcell, to critical acclaim. She then became associate artist at Belvoir. They wrote this play out of a desire after realising that there were few Indigenous Australians represented on TV and even fewer on the stage, and that suicides in the community were not being talked about. In 2018 Alberts directed the play for a collaborative production by Malthouse and STCSA, in her directorial debut, which was again well-received. Many elements of the production were different, but Lisa Flanagan reprised her role as Petra.

Screen
Alberts was a regular on Cleverman and a co-winner of the Outstanding Performance by an Ensemble Series in a Drama Series at the 2018 Equity Ensemble Awards. They also wrote for the series.

Personal life
 Alberts is in a relationship with actress Kate Box, and they have three children together. They both appeared in prison drama series Wentworth.

Alberts is non-binary and has stated a preference for using they/them pronouns.

Recognition and awards
 2007: Winner, Adelaide Critics Circle Award for Best Emerging Artist, for What I Heard About Iraq (Holden Street Theatres)
 2013: Recipient of the Balnaves Award, a fellowship to support an emerging First Nations playwright to create a new work at the Belvoir
 2014: Nomination, Sydney Theatre Awards for Best New Australian Work, for Brothers Wreck
 2015: Nomination for the Nick Enright Prize for Playwriting at the NSW Premier's Literary Awards, for Brothers Wreck
 2015: Nomination, AWGIE Awards,  Best Stage Play, for Brothers Wreck
 2016: Winner, Early Career Writing Award in the inaugural Mona Brand Awards at the State Library of New South Wales (worth )

Filmography
Film and television appearances as an actor include:
 Television 
Mystery Road (2020) TV series — Fran (6 episodes)
Wake in Fright (2017) TV mini series — Sandy Fanshawe (2 episodes)
Cleverman (2016–17) TV series — Nerida West (12 episodes)
Wentworth, s1–2 (2013–14) TV series — Toni Goodes (5 episodes)
Redfern Now (2012) TV series — Marcia (1 episode)
Rush (2010) TV series, S3 — Private Leanne Daly (1 episode)

 Film

 The Stranger (2022) — Detective Kate Rylett
Red Hill (2010) — Ellin Conway

References

External links
 
 Jada Alberts on AusStage

Australian television actors
Australian stage actors
Living people
Year of birth missing (living people)
Australian LGBT actors
Australian LGBT screenwriters
Australian LGBT dramatists and playwrights
Non-binary dramatists and playwrights
Non-binary screenwriters
Australian non-binary actors